"C'Mon" is a R&B single by Mario. It is the third single from his debut studio album Mario. The single was released on January 14, 2003. The song was written by Warryn Campbell, Luther Campbell, David Hobbs, Chris Wong Won and Mark Ross.

Music video
A music video was released on YouTube on October 29, 2009 at a total length of three minutes and thirty-five seconds. The video was directed by Erik White.

Track listing

Chart performance

Weekly charts

Release history

References

2003 singles
Mario (singer) songs
Music videos directed by Erik White
2002 songs
J Records singles
Songs written by Warryn Campbell